Egido is a surname. Notable people with the surname include:

José Ángel Egido (born 1951), Spanish actor
 (born 1928), Spanish poet
Mercedes de Jesús Egido (1935–2004), Spanish Roman Catholic nun

See also
Egidio